Snow Hill Historic District is a national historic district located at Snow Hill, Greene County, North Carolina. The district encompasses 229 contributing buildings, a contributing site (St. Barnabas Church Cemetery), two contributing structures, and a contributing object (Clara Ernart gravestone) in the central business district and surrounding residential sections of Snow Hill. The buildings are in a variety of popular 19th and early-20th century architectural styles including Greek Revival, Gothic Revival, Colonial Revival, and, Bungalow / American Craftsman. Located in the district are the separately listed Greene County Courthouse and St. Barnabas Episcopal Church.  Other notable buildings include J. Exum & Co. Grocery building, Harper Drugstore, Sugg-Harper House, Williams-Exum Housem, Murphrey-Morrill House (1885), Josiah Exum House (1887-1888), Alfred Warren House (1912-1915), Calvary Memorial Methodist Church (1928), Snow Hill Presbyterian Church (1935), and former First Baptist Church (1850, 1940).

It was listed on the National Register of Historic Places in 2000, with a boundary increase in 2009.

References

Historic districts on the National Register of Historic Places in North Carolina
Greek Revival architecture in North Carolina
Gothic Revival architecture in North Carolina
Colonial Revival architecture in North Carolina
Buildings and structures in Greene County, North Carolina
National Register of Historic Places in Greene County, North Carolina